Nepal Sukumbasi Party (Loktantrik) is a political party in Nepal. The party seeks to represent squatters.

In the 2008 Constituent Assembly election, the party presented 11 candidates in the First Past the Post system and a list of 58 names for the Proportional Representation vote. The party got 1459 votes (0.01%) in the FPTP system and 8322 votes (0.08%) in the PR system.

References

Political parties in Nepal